Gettin' the Message is an album by jazz organist Johnny "Hammond" Smith recorded for the Prestige label in 1960.

Reception

AllMusic awarded the album 3 stars stating "this is a solidly entertaining and texturally intriguing album".

Track listing
All compositions by Johnny "Hammond" Smith except where noted.
 "Swanee River" (Traditional) – 8:57
 "Just Say So Long" – 4:03
 "Lid Flippin'" – 5:17
 "Gettin' the Message" – 7:15
 "Princess" – 5:30
 "Dementia" – 5:18

Personnel
Johnny "Hammond" Smith – organ
Lem Winchester – vibraphone
Eddie McFadden – guitar
Wendell Marshall – bass
Bill Erskine – drums
 Esmond Edwards – producer
 Rudy Van Gelder – engineer

References

Johnny "Hammond" Smith albums
1961 albums
Prestige Records albums
Albums produced by Esmond Edwards
Albums recorded at Van Gelder Studio